Two major human polls made up the 2021 NCAA Division I women's soccer rankings: United Soccer Coaches and Top Drawer Soccer.  They represented the ranking system for the 2021 NCAA Division I women's soccer season.

Legend

United Soccer Coaches 

Source:

Top Drawer Soccer 

Source:

References

Rankings
College women's soccer rankings in the United States